The Proteus Operation is a science fiction alternate history novel written by James P. Hogan. The plot focuses on an Anglo-American team of soldiers and civilians sent back in time from the Nazi-dominated world of 1975
to prevent an Axis victory in World War II that was engineered by more advanced time travelers from the 21st century. 

Historical figures in the book include Isaac Asimov, Wilhelm Canaris, Winston Churchill, Duff Cooper, Anthony Eden, Albert Einstein, Enrico Fermi, Reinhard Heydrich, Adolf Hitler, Heinrich Himmler, John F. Kennedy, Frederick Lindemann, George Pegram, Franklin D. Roosevelt, Leo Szilard, and Edward Teller. Of these, only Asimov and Teller were still alive when the novel was published in 1985.

Plot

Originally, the First World War was a complete wake-up call for the human race, leading to greater internationalism and a "Never Again" spirit towards war that would eventually wear away the differences between the various power-blocs. By the 2020s, a global League of Nations oversees a planet totally at peace. The fledgling Nazi Party, in this 'original' timeline, simply faded out after the 1923 Beer Hall Putsch.

Many in the modern aristocracy, corporate dynasties, and others feel they have lost out because of the social transformations enabled by decades of peace and co-operation. This group come up with a plan to build a functional "time machine" and change history for their benefit. Their scheme is to go back as far as they can (roughly a century, to the very early 1920s) and mentor the fledgling Nazi Party. They regard the Nazis as the perfect tool for destroying the Soviet Union and establishing an elitist tyranny with which they can live the lives of luxury and entitlement they believe have been stolen from them. This 'Uptime' initiative sends 21st century advisors, armament, and nuclear weapons to support Adolf Hitler.

The Hitler that they seek to advise soon develops other plans. Learning about the original history from his time traveling advisors, Hitler uses these lessons to ensure that Western Europe falls swiftly, followed by dropping a few of the Uptime nuclear weapons to wipe out the Soviet Union. He then destroys his end of the "time conduit" and declares independence from his former sponsors. By the 1970s, Nazi Germany and the Empire of Japan have conquered everything other than North America, Australasia, and parts of South America. Africa has suffered an enormous genocide every bit as complete as the one inflicted upon the Jews, and the Axis powers stand poised in 1975 to start a final war that the United States is bound to lose, given the military power of Nazi Germany.

An organization in this altered 1975 discovers the secret behind the Nazi successes of the previous decades. The group decides that it will build its own time machine to go back and stop the present nightmare of Nazi world domination. This 1975 time machine is not as advanced or powerful as the original 2020s machine, so they can only open a gate to 1939. The plan is to establish a military alliance between the 1975 America of President John F. Kennedy and the 1939 America of President Franklin D. Roosevelt. The team starts noticing that events they had no hand in are different (such as the Joe Louis versus John Henry Lewis fight and the death of Pope Pius XI) and with Einstein's help realize that all possible outcomes already exist and all time travel does is take you to one of these other branches.

Realizing why things have gone wrong, it is up to the 1975 Uptime agents, cut off in 1939, to keep the western Allies, including the United Kingdom and the United States in the fight, while working to close off Hitler's gateway to the alternate 2020s before he gets his atomic bomb and missile advantage.

In the end, they succeed, and this second "alternate timeline" they create turns out to be our own world.  They also realize that the United States of their own time knew they couldn't really change their present and was in reality planning to escape to the reality they would create just as the people backing Hitler had planned to do.  To prevent their United States or Nazi Germany from invading our world they have the gate destroyed.

See also

 Axis victory in World War II (an extensive list of other Wikipedia articles regarding works of Nazi Germany/Axis/World War II alternate history)

References

External links
The Proteus Operation at the author's official website

1985 British novels
1985 science fiction novels
British science fiction novels
Novels about time travel
Alternate Nazi Germany novels
Bantam Spectra books